Olivier Voutier (born 30 May 1796 in Thouars, France; died 18 April 1877 at Hyères, France) was a French naval officer who discovered the statue of the Venus de Milo in 1820, and fought in the Greek War of Independence.

Discovery of the Venus de Milo 

Voutier was the son of a naval officer, and at the age of fifteen entered the Naval School in Brest. In April 1820, at the age of twenty-three he was an ensign on the French naval schooner Estafette stopping at the island in Milo in the Aegean. He was interested in the history of ancient Greece, and decided to see if he could find any objects of interest. He took two sailors with shovels and picks, and began digging in the ruins of an ancient theater located on the side of the island's highest hill.  Voutier and the sailors found marble fragments, a bust, a carved foot, and two statues missing their heads, hands and feet. 

What happened next was described by author Gregory Curtis in his 2004 Disarmed, the Story of the Venus de Milo: 

"As Voutier and the two sailors were digging, another man, a local farmer as it turned out, was also working just twenty paces away trying to remove the stones from an ancient wall to use in a structure he was building on his farm. Voutier, glancing over that way, noticed that the man had stopped digging for the moment and was staring at something in a niche he had uncovered in the wall. His posture was curious enough that Voutier went to look himself.

As Voutier drew near, he could see that the farmer was busy again, covering something with dirt. Peering into the darkness of the chamber where the farmer was working, Voutier saw a statue, or at least the upper half of one, lying on its side and still partly buried. Its odd shape made it useless as a building block, so the farmer had decided to cover it over. Voutier gave him a small bribe to dig up the statue instead. It didn't take long to push aside the accumulated dirt and stones and prop the object up. It was the nude upper body of a woman. The tip of her nose and the small bun of hair gathered at the back of her head were both broken off. There was an ugly hole in her right side that Voutier assumed was the result of some crude restoration from long ago. Stains, nicks, and scrapes, evidently from the time when it had first fallen over, covered the surface of the statue. But despite these imperfections, Voutier sensed from the first glance that he was seeing something extraordinary. This torso was more glorious than anything he could have hoped to find when he set out that morning with the two sailors and a few picks and shovels.

Voutier insisted that the farmer search for the lower half of the statue, but his insistence revealed his excitement. Now the farmer wanted more money to continue digging. Voutier paid. He joined the farmer inside the niche, an oval enclosure about five yards wide. The walls were cut stone and had once been painted in a pattern that was still faintly visible. Overhead was an arched roof.

After a little digging here and there amid the rubble on the floor, the farmer found the lower half of the statue and brought it up out of the dirt. But the two parts couldn't be reassembled because a large section missing from the right side made it impossible to balance the top half on the lower. Yet another bribe persuaded the farmer to continue digging, but this time, since the missing piece was considerably smaller than the other two, the search took more work and time. When the farmer wanted to quit, Voutier calmly prodded him until he finally discovered the missing middle section.

At last Voutier and the farmer, perhaps with help from the two sailors, were able to place the top half of the statue on the lower. When they slid the middle section between the two larger pieces, the statue balanced, and they were able to see it as it was intended: a woman, nude from the waist up, her legs covered in wet drapery that was falling from her hips. This was of course the statue that would become known to the world as the Venus de Milo."    

Contrary to some accounts, the statue did not have its arms when it was discovered, as shown in drawings that Voutier made of the statue at the  time.

The farmer, whose name was Yorgos Ketrotas, was interested in selling the statue.  Over the next ten days, Voutrier brought Louis Brest, the  French vice-consul on Milos, to see what he had found, along with a number of sailors and naval officers. One was a naval officer named Jules Dumont d'Urville.  D'Urville, a classicist, recognized the identity of the statue and the importance of the  discovery.  However, the Captain of the Chevrette would not take the statue onto the ship.  D'Urville wrote to the French Ambassador in Constantinople, the Marquis de Riviere, then went in person and persuaded him to buy the statue for France, which he did. A ship was sent to take the statue back to Toulon, and in 1821, the statue was presented to King Louis XVIII of France, who in turn donated it to the Louvre.

Voutier in the Greek War of Independence 

In 1821, Voutier resigned from the Navy and joined the Greek insurgents in the Greek War of Independence, under the command of Demetrios Ypsilantis.  He took part in the siege of Tripolizza, where he arrived in September 1821, in the company of a British supporter of Greek independence, Thomas Gordon.  In March 1822 the Minister of War of the provisional government of Greece, Ioannis Kolettis, gave Voutier the assignment of laying siege to the center of Athens without damaging its monuments. He was later named a colonel in the Greek Army. 

He retired to the city of Hyères in 1847, where he purchased the land of a former convent in the hills and constructed a villa called the Castel Sainte-Claire. He is buried in the park of the villa.

Sources and citations

Bibliography 
  Curtis, Gregory, Disarmed - The Story of the Venus de Milo. Vintage, 2004. 
  Colonel Voutier, Découverte et acquisition de la Vénus de Milo, Hyères, 1874, in-8° br. 
 Jean-Paul Alaux, La Vénus de Milo et Olivier Voutier, Collection du galion d’or chez Jean-Paul Alaux, Paris, 1939. 
 Jules Sébastien César Dumont d'Urville, Marie-Louis-Augustin Demartin du Tyrac et Olivier Voutier, L’Enlèvement de Vénus, La Bibliothèque, 1994. 
 Takis Thédoropoulos : L'invention de la Vénus de Milo Sabine Wespieser Editeur, 

1796 births
1877 deaths
People from Deux-Sèvres
French Navy officers
Hellenic Army officers
Greek colonels
French philhellenes in the Greek War of Independence